Mitsopoulos is a Greek surname. Notable people with the surname include:

 (1844–1911), Greek scientist and professor
Nadia Mitsopoulos (born 1971), Australian journalist
Tasos Mitsopoulos (1965–2014), Cypriot politician

See also
Mitropoulos

Greek-language surnames